The Dnieper Hydroelectric Station; also known as Dnipro Dam, in the city of Zaporizhzhia, Ukraine, is the largest hydroelectric power station on the Dnieper river. It is the fifth step of the Dnieper cascade of hydroelectric stations that provides electric power for the Donets–Kryvyi Rih Industrial region. The Dnieper Reservoir stretches 129 km upstream to near Dnipro city.

The station was built by the Soviet Union in two stages. DniproHES-1 was first built in 1927–1932, but destroyed during World War II to make it harder for the advancing German forces to cross the river, then rebuilt in 1944–1950. DniproHES-2 was built in 1969–1980 and modernized during the 2000s. 

The dam is an important crossing of the Dnieper. It has a water lock that allows navigation along the river and around the dam. A highway connecting the banks of the Dnieper crosses a bridge over the lock.

Construction

Early plans 

In the lower reaches of the Dnieper River, there was an almost -long-stretch that was filled with the Dnieper Rapids. This is approximately the distance between the modern cities Dnipro and Zaporizhzhia. During the 19th century, engineers worked on the projects to make the river navigable.

While the main objective of these projects was to improve navigation, hydroelectric power generation was developed concurrently, in terms of the "utilization of the freely flowing water".
G. Graftio's(RU) 1905 project included three dams with a small area of flooding.

GOELRO plan and construction, 1921–1941 

The Dneprostroi Dam was built on vacated land in the countryside to stimulate Soviet industrialization. A special company was formed called Dniprobud or Dneprostroi (hence the dam's alternative name) that later built other dams on the Dnieper and exists to this day. The design for the dam that was accepted dates back to the USSR GOELRO electrification plan which was adopted in early 1920s. The station was designed by a group of engineers headed by Prof. Ivan Alexandrov, a chief expert of GOELRO, who later became a head of the RSFSR State Planning Commission. The station was planned to provide electricity for several aluminum production plants and a high quality iron and steel plant that were also to be constructed in the area.

The DniproHES project used the experience gained from the construction of the Sir Adam Beck Hydroelectric Power Stations at Niagara Falls, Ontario, the Hydroelectric Island Maligne, Quebec, and the La Gabelle Generating Station on the St. Maurice River.

On September 17, 1932, the Soviet government awarded six American engineers (including Hugh Cooper, William V. Murphy, and G. Thompson, engineers of General Electric) with the Order of the Red Banner of Labour for "the outstanding work in the construction of DniproHES".

Soviet industrialization was accompanied by a wide propaganda effort. Leon Trotsky, by then out of power, campaigned for the idea within the ruling Politburo in early 1926. In a speech to the Komsomol youth movement, he said:

In the south the Dnieper runs its course through the wealthiest industrial lands; and it is wasting the prodigious weight of its pressure, playing over age-old rapids and waiting until we harness its stream, curb it with dams, and compel it to give lights to cities, to drive factories, and to enrich ploughland. We shall compel it!

The dam and its buildings were designed by the constructivist architects Viktor Vesnin and Nikolai Kolli. Construction began in 1927, and the plant started to produce electricity in October 1932. Generating about 560 MW, the station became the largest Soviet power plant at the time and the third-largest in the world, following the Hoover Dam, 705 MW, and the Wilson Dam, 663 MW, in the United States.

American specialists under the direction of Col. Hugh Cooper took part in the construction. The first five giant power generators were manufactured by the General Electric Company. During the second five-year plan, four more generators of similar power that were produced by Elektrosila in Leningrad were installed. The Dneprostroi Dam was the largest dam in Europe at the time of its construction.

The industrial centres of Zaporizhzhia, Kryvy Rih, and Dnipro grew from the power provided by the station, including such electricity-consuming industries as aluminium production, which was vitally important for Soviet aviation.

World War II and post-war reconstruction
During World War II, the strategically important dam and plant was dynamited by retreating Red Army troops in 1941 after Germany's invasion of the Soviet Union. American journalist H. R. Knickerbocker wrote that year:

The flooding surge killed 20,000 to over 100,000 unsuspecting civilians, as well as Red Army officers who were crossing over the river. It was partially dynamited again by retreating German troops in 1943. In the end, the dam suffered extensive damage, and the powerhouse hall was nearly destroyed. Both were rebuilt between 1944 and 1949.

General Electric built the new generators for the dam. Their weight was more than 1,020.58 tonnes. The generators replaced those destroyed during World War II. Each of the new units is rated 90 MW, as compared to the 77.5 MW of the old generators built in 1931. With a frame diameter of 12.93 metres, units were shipped in 1946.

Power generation was restarted in 1950. In 1969–1980, the second powerhouse was built with a production capacity of 828 MW.Currently, the dam is over 800 meters long and 61 metres high. The dam elevates the river water up to 37 m, which floods the rapids above and makes the entire Dnieper navigable. Over its long history, the dam was hailed as one of the greatest achievements of Soviet industrialization programs.

Post-Soviet time

Today, the dam has been privatized and continues to power the adjacent industrial complexes. The pressure of the water leaving the dam is at 38.7 metres and the reservoir that is behind it is approximately 3.3 cubic kilometres. The dam is also used by traffic.

In the spring of 2016, all communist symbols (including the sign that stated that the dam was named after Vladimir Lenin) were removed from the dam in order to comply with decommunization laws.

See also
 Eighth All-Ukrainian Congress of Soviets
 Hydroelectricity in Ukraine
 List of power stations in Ukraine
 Zaporizhzhia Pylon Triple

References

Further reading
 "Комсомольская правда" об угрозах плотины Киевской ГЭС и водохранилища 
 "Аргументы и факты" о реальных угрозах дамбы Киевского водохранилища и ГЭС  
 "Известия" о проблематике плотины Киевского водохранилища и ГЭС
 Эксперт УНИАН об угрозах дамбы Киевского водохранилища

External links 

 
 Dnieper Hydroelectric Station // Encyclopedia of Ukraine
  Information from site dedicated to 85th anniversary of GOERLO
  Official website of Ukrhydroenergy
 Dnieper Hydroelectric Power Station, photographs by Georges Dedoyard, 1932, Canadian Centre for Architecture (digitized items)
  The explosion of the Dnieper Hydroelectric Power Station

Dams in Ukraine
Hydroelectric power stations built in the Soviet Union
Hydroelectric power stations in Ukraine
Companies based in Zaporizhzhia
Buildings and structures in Zaporizhzhia
Constructivist architecture
Dams completed in 1932
State companies of Ukraine
Dams on the Dnieper
Tourist attractions in Zaporizhzhia